The Diocese of Malabar is one of the 30 dioceses of the Malankara Orthodox Syrian Church, with its headquarters at Kozhikode, Kerala, in India.

History

The Malabar Diocese, which covers western districts of Kerala, was formed in 1953. Paulose Mar Sevarios and Pathrose Mar Osthathios (1953–68) have executed its administration at different times. Since 11 November 1966, Thomas Mar Timotheos became the diocesan head and later became Baselios Marthoma Didymus I,Catholicose of the East. Mount Hermon Aramana in Kozhikode is the diocesan headquarters.

Some of the institutions functioning under the aegis of the diocese are the St. Thomas Home and Estate and the Aravanchal Estate at Erumamunda and Attapadi, the Parumala Mar Gregorios Orthodox Guidance Center, and the Attapadi St. Thomas Mission Center. The diocesan journal Hermon Sandhesam has been published since 1997.There are 82 parishes in the diocese. HG. Dr. Abraham Mar Seraphim Metropolitan is the Asst. Metropolitan of this diocese.

Parish List
1) Akampadom St.Marys Orthodox Church

2) Attapady St.George Orthodox Church

3) Ambhazappara St.George Orthodox Church

4) Alathoor St.Stephens Orthodox Church

5) Agali St.Marys Orthodox Church

6) Chalickalpotti St.Thomas Catholicate Center

7) Chathamangalam St.Thomas Orthodox Church

8) Chittoor St.Gregorios Orthodox Church

9) Chirackalpady St.Gregorios Orthodox Church

10) Chungathara St.George Orthodox Valiyapali

11) Chokkadu St.Marys Orthodox Church

12) Edakkara St.Marys Orthodox Church

13) Elamali St.George Orthodox Church

14) Jellipara St.Stephens Orthodox Church

15) Kannur St.Thomas Orthodox Church

16) Kadampazhippuram St.Gregorios Orthodox Church

17) Kanchikode St.Gregorios Orthodox Church

18) Kalladicode St.Thomas Orthodox Church

19) Karulai St.George Orthodox Church

20) Karuvarakundu St.George Orthodox Church

21) Karimba St.Johns Orthodox Valiyapali

22) Karappuram St.Stephens Orthodox Church

23) Kunninmelpotty Mar Yacob Burdana Orthodox Church

24) Koodaranji St.Pauls Orthodox Church

25) Kollencode St.Marys Orthodox Church

26) Kulathoor St.Marys Orthodox Church

27) Keralathotam St.George Orthodox Church

28) Kottopadam St.Marys Orthodox Church

29) Kottackal St.Gregorios Orthodox Church

30) Kozhikode St.George Orthodox Cathedral

31) Kongadu St.George Orthodox Church

32) Mycavu St.Marys Orthodox Church

33) Manjeri Mar Gregorios Orthodox Church

34) Malachy St.George Orthodox Church

35) Mannarkkad St.Marys Orthodox Church

36) Malampuzha Mar Gregorios Orthodox Church

37) Malappuram  Mar Gregorios Orthodox Church

38) Mamankara Mar Gregorios Orthodox Church

39) Mavoor St.Marys Orthodox Church

40) Mattannur St.Marys Orthodox Church

41) Modappoika St.George Orthodox Church

42) Mundanpara St.George Orthodox Church

43) Mundur Mar Gregorios Orthodox Church

44) Munderi Mar Baselios Orthodox Church

45) Muthukurissy St.George Orthodox Church

46) Muthukulam St.Marys Orthodox Church

47) Nilambur Mar Gregorios Orthodox Church

48) Nellipoyil St.Thomas Orthodox Church

49) Nemara Chathamangalam St.George Orthodox Church

50) Olavakkode St.George Orthodox Church

51) Ottapalam St.Gregorios Orthodox Church

52) Onjil St.Thomas Orthodox Church

53) Panamanna St.Marys Orthodox Church

54) Parali Mar Gregorios Orthodox Church

55) Palakunnu St.Peters and St.Pauls Orthodox Church

56) Pathirikkode St.Marys Orthodox Church

57) Pariyapuram St.Marys Orthodox Church

58) Palakkad St Mary's Orthodox Church

59) Palunda St.Marys Orthodox Church

60) Payyanadom St.Pauls Orthodox Church

61) Puthuppady St.George Orthodox Valiyapali

62) Puthuppady St.Thomas Orthodox Church

63) Puliyakkod St.George Orthodox Church

64) Pulickakadu St.George Orthodox Church

65) Puthankulambu St.George Orthodox Church

66) Poolapadom St.Johns Orthodox Church

67) Perumkulam Mar Gregorios Orthodox Church

68) Perinthalmana St.George Orthodox Church

69) Peruvannamoozhy St.George Orthodox Church

70) Pombra Mar Gregorios Orthodox Church

71) Shornur St.Marys Orthodox Church

72) Sholayur St.Marys Orthodox Church

73) Thaliparambu St.Gregorios Orthodox Church

74) Thalassery St.Marys Orthodox Church

75) Tenjipalam St.Gregorios

76) Thirur St.Gregorios Orthodox Church

77) Vadakara St.Gregorios Orthodox Church

78) Vadapuram St.George Orthodox Valiyapali

79) Velamcode St.Marys Orthodox Church

80) Vazhikadavu St.Thomas Orthodox Church

81) Vengara Mar Gregorios Orthodox Church

82) Kakkavayal St.Gregorios Orthodox Church

External links
 Malankara Sabha History

Malankara Orthodox Syrian Church dioceses
1953 establishments in India